Ballyduff GAA may refer to:

Sport clubs 

Ballyduff Upper GAA, in Ballyduff Upper, County Waterford, Ireland
Ballyduff Lower GAA, in Ballyduff Lower, County Waterford, Ireland
Ballyduff GAA (Kerry), in Ballyduff, County Kerry, Ireland